A list of international common and basic technical standards, which have been established worldwide and are related by their frequent and widespread use. These standards are conventionally accepted as best practice and used globally by industry and organizations.

In circumstances and situations there are certain methods and systems that are used as benchmarks, guidelines or protocols for communication, measurement, orientation, reference for information, science, symbols and time. These standards are employed to universally convey meaning, classification and to relate details of information.

The standards listed may be formal or informal and some might not be recognised by all governments or organizations.

Communication
Braille
International Code of Signals
International Maritime Signal Flags
International Phonetic Alphabet
In radio communications

Radiotelephony procedure
 Procedure word
 International Radiotelephony Spelling Alphabet
 Aeronautical Code signals
 Maritime Mobile Service Q Codes
 Standard Marine Communication Phrases
 Brevity code
 Q code
 Call sign
In electronics
 Unicode

Manufacturing
ISO 216 or A4 paper

Measurement
International System of Units
Standard mathematical notation 
Metric system

Reference for information
Barcode
International Standard Book Number
QR code
Uniform resource locator
vCard
In geographical location
Cartography
Geotagging
Geographic coordinate system

Science
Medical classification

Symbols
Chemical symbols
Hazard symbol
International Symbol of Access
In electronics
Electronic symbols, for circuit diagrams
Media control symbols
Power symbol

Time
Time zones
Universal Time

See also

 Communications protocol
 Index of standards articles
 International Communication Association
 International Electrotechnical Commission
 International Organization for Standardization
 International Statistical Classification of Diseases and Related Health Problems
 International regulation
 List of symbols
 Lists of spoken and written languages
 Substitute flag

External links 
ISO - International Organization for Standardization

Lists of standards
Outlines of society
Wikipedia outlines